Wakaleo vanderleuri is a species of marsupial lion of the genus Wakaleo, that lived in Australia during the Miocene (about 16 to 10million years ago).

Description 
Being a marsupial, it is not closely related to true cats. This animal is hypothesized to have been an omnivore, eating significant amounts of meat, perhaps more like a bear in diet and habit than like an actual lion. It lacked large canine-like fangs, producing some controversy regarding just how much it actually preyed on living animals. The meat-eating hypothesis is based largely upon the morphology of its molar teeth. The species is believed to have been able to hunt by leaping from trees onto its prey.

The type species fossils were originally found in the Bullock Creek (Northern Territory) area. It has been found in limestone deposits in Riversleigh.

The first fossil, a right dentary fragment, was found in 1967 by a group of field workers at Bullock Creek in the Northern Territory. A left dentary of the species in a good state of preservation was described in 1896. Since then more fossils have been recovered, including a well-preserved near-complete cranium with the mandible intact.

References

External links
Mikko's Phylogeny Archive
Australian Museum

Miocene mammals of Australia
Miocene marsupials
Riversleigh fauna
Fossil taxa described in 1974
Taxa named by William A. Clemens Jr.
Wakaleo